August Rattas (1892 – 1938? Soviet Union) was an Estonian politician. He was a member of the V Riigikogu, representing the Left-wing Workers.

References

1892 births
1938 deaths
Left-wing Workers politicians
Members of the Riigikogu, 1932–1934
Estonian emigrants to the Soviet Union